Butkus is the masculine form of a Lithuanian family name. Its feminine forms  are: Butkienė or Butkuvienė (married woman or widow) and Butkutė (unmarried woman). The surname is derived from the diminutive form Butkus of the Lithuanina given name Butkintas.

The surname may refer to:

 Carl Butkus  (1922–1978), a Lithuanian-American football player
 Dick Butkus (born 1942), a Lithuanian-American football player
 Luke Butkus (born 1979), a Lithuanian-American football player
 Vytautas Butkus (born 1949), a Lithuanian rower
 Zenonas Butkus (born 1951), a Lithuanian historian

References

Lithuanian-language surnames